The Tomb of Abdul Qadir Amin Khan is a tomb located in Patancheru, Hyderabad. It was completed in 1568.

It is the resting place of Abdul Qadir Amin Khan, a minister in the Golconda Sultanate under Ibrahim Qutb Shah, who also served as the chieftain of Patancheru. The tomb is surrounded by a vegetable and fruit bazaar.

Architecture 
The tomb is built in the traditional Qutb Shahi style, on a raised platform with an onion dome. It is embellished with stucco work.

Inscription 
The Persian inscription on the tomb's Eastern wall says that Amin Khan commissioned the tomb himself and dates it to 1568. It also lists the names of his father, grandfather, wives, and sons.

See also 
 Qutb Shahi tombs

References

External links
 Image of the tomb exterior

Qutb Shahi architecture
Tombs in India